Junior High School 149 Elijah D. Clark was a public junior high school in New York City, New York.

The school was at 360 East 145th Street in the Mott Haven section of the South Bronx. There were two Elijah D. Clark Junior High schools in this part of the Bronx.  The earlier one was PS 37, Bronx, (which spanned) 145th Street and 146th Street, near Willis Avenue. Pictures from December 6, 1905 and 1908 also attesting to the address near where the later school was built are on the NYC Municipal Archives website. and the later one P.S. 149, that appears to be close to where P.S. 37 was.  P.S. meaning Public School. Dr. Elijah D. Clark was principal of P. S. 37 as far back as 1906. In 1905 he was Principal of, Borough of the Bronx, Public School 31, Mott and Walton Avenues, 145th and 146th Streets. He died on June 25, 1916, aged 66 years. He began to teach in the New York schools in 1872, and became Principal in 1889. In the same area, P.S 149 took the place of P.S. 37.

It was too, it seems was named for its first principal, who previously had served as a teacher and assistant principal in the Bronx.  Reflecting its surrounding neighborhood, the school served a primarily Puerto Rican and African-American student body.

Harry Feldman, later a Major League Baseball pitcher, attended the school.

JHS 149 was the scene of several violent incidents in its later years, including the murder of a student in 1990.  An assistant principal was arrested on drug charges in 1995.  JHS 149 was closed in 2004 due to poor academic performance.  Today, the school building is occupied by Bronx Preparatory Charter School and MS223.

Notable alumni of P.S. 37 include Walden Cassotto (Bobby Darin) and  Dick Brookz founder of The Houdini Museum

Notable alumni of P.S. 149 include Bronx Borough President Rubén Díaz, Jr.

New York City Councilmember Mark D. Levine was a teacher at the school from 1991 to 1993.

See also

References

External links
Inside Schools profile

1961 establishments in New York City
2004 disestablishments in New York (state)
Defunct schools in New York City
Educational institutions disestablished in 2004
Educational institutions established in 1961
Public middle schools in the Bronx
Mott Haven, Bronx